The Art Collection of Henry Gurdon Marquand was a collection of antiques and paintings owned by Henry Gurdon Marquand, the second president of the Metropolitan Museum of Art, until his death in 1902.

History
In the late 1840s, after the sale of his family's jewelry business and store (which was renamed to Ball, Tompkins & Black), Marquand traveled to Europe where he met Henry Kirke Brown and other expatriate American sculptors in Rome. While there, he "began to 'frequent studios' and "to understand the artists' 'hopes, aims, and aspirations.' There Marquand fell under the spell of what Henry James called 'the old and complex civilization.'" He returned in 1852 with his new wife and spent a year in Rome, where the first of their six children was born. In 1889, he became the second president of the Metropolitan Museum of Art, and made many significant gifts to the Metropolitan Museum, including works by Filippo Lippi, Lucas van Leyden, Frans Hals, Anthony van Dyck, Rembrandt, Diego Velázquez, Thomas Gainsborough, John Trumbull and John Singer Sargent.

Following his 1902 death, his collection exhibited at the American Art Galleries in New York before it was put up for auction. In conjunction with the January and February 1903 auction, The American Art Association put out the Illustrated Catalogue of the Art and Literary Property Collected by the late Henry G. Marquand, edited by Thomas E. Kirby. In the foreword by art critic Russell Sturgis, he wrote:

"He bought like an Italian price of the Renaissance. He collected for his own delight and for the enjoyment and instruction of his many friends. A noble Van Dyck portrait appealed to him, and so did a Persian vase. He was the most eager purchaser of a single newly found gem of antique art; he would chase the elusive thing with more energy than another, and therefore he secured the price. He felt also the impossibility of understanding a branch of art, or a special manufacture, or mode of design, without having many pieces to represent and explain it, and so he bought largely along some chosen lines."

The sale of his collection brought $197,070 for 93 paintings (including A Reading from Homer by Sir Lawrence Alma-Tadema which sold for $30,300), $22,637 for "255 vases, jars, dishes, bowls, beakers, incense burners, water-vases, wine cups, and writer's water jars", and $234,564 for rugs and tapestries, including a 15th or early 16th-century Persian rug that brought $38,000. Another $117,000 was received for enamels, pottery, bronzes, tiles and intaglios. A single retable (altar piece) brought $26,000.

Collection

Paintings

Furniture and stained glass

Sculptures

Decorative arts

Illustrated Catalogue (1903)

References
Notes

Sources

External links

Collecting Old Masters for New York, Esmée Quodbach

Private art collections
Art collections in the United States